LARC-XV (Lighter, Amphibious Resupply, Cargo, 15 ton), introduced in 1960, is an aluminium hulled amphibious cargo vehicle. It measures 45 by 15 feet and is powered by 2-300 hp engines.

About 100 were made with a small batch sent to Germany.

See also
LARC-V
LARC-LX

References

External links
 LARC-XV at GlobalSecurity.org

Wheeled amphibious vehicles
Military vehicles of the United States
Military vehicles introduced in the 1960s